This is a list of cooking techniques commonly used in cooking and food preparation.

Cooking is the art of preparing food for ingestion, commonly with the application of differentiated heating. Cooking techniques and ingredients vary widely across the world, reflecting unique environments, economics, cultural traditions, and trends. The way that cooking takes place also depends on the skill and type of training of an individual cook as well as the resources available to cook with, such as good butter which heavily impacts the meal.

A

B

C

D

E

F

G

H

I

J

K

L

M

N

O

P

R

S

T

V

W

Z

See also

 Lists of food and beverage topics
Culinary arts
 Food preparation
 Food science
 Molecular gastronomy
 Molecular mixology
 Note by Note cuisine
 Food processing
 Meal preparation
 Outline of food preparation

References

Further reading

External links

 Culinary Arts Basics: The Fundamentals of Cooking. About.com.

Cooking techniques